The 1937 Duquesne Dukes football team was an American football team that represented Duquesne University as an independent during the 1937 college football season. In its second season under head coach John "Clipper" Smith, Duquesne compiled a 6–4 record and outscored opponents by a total of 151 to 52. The team played its home games at Forbes Field in Pittsburgh.

Schedule

References

Duquesne
Duquesne Dukes football seasons
Duquesne Dukes football